Helena Suková was the defending champion, but lost in the quarterfinals to Natasha Zvereva.

Zvereva won the title by defeating Rachel McQuillan 6–4, 6–0 in the final.

Seeds
The first eight seeds seeds received a bye into the second round.

Draw

Finals

Top half

Section 1

Section 2

Bottom half

Section 3

Section 4

References

External links
 Official results archive (ITF)
 Official results archive (WTA)

1990 Singles
1990 WTA Tour
1990 in Australian tennis